Havering Museum is a local museum located in the town of Romford, in the London Borough of Havering. It is primarily focused on the studies and artifacts from the five towns that encompass the borough of Havering. Located in what remains of the old Ind Coope Romford Brewery, it is one of the last reminders of Romford's brewing history. Completely volunteer run, the museum is self-funded through various Events, Groups and Sponsors. Relating to the history of the London Borough of Havering, providing a home for exhibits of Havering's past defining what makes Havering Havering, celebrating the achievements of local people past and present.

History 
The Museum started out as the thought of local historian Ian Wilkes who in 2000 formed Friends Of Havering Museum, the hard work and determination of local people in 2008 grew partnership with the London Borough of Havering the project received a Heritage Lottery Fund grant, opening in May 2010.

Activities 
The Museum has many activities which it runs throughout the course of the year. These range from its Wednesday and Thursday Variety club and its Friday Reminiscence group. It hosts a series of internal talks relating to exhibits that are running at the time along with Events for both the general public and the Friends of Havering Museum. It showcases many local resident exhibits, ranging from local artists to the Havering Quilters along with the Museum's very own Photographic Group. It caters for children during the six weeks with a series of Family Fun day activities and attempts to reach out to local schools.

There are separate exhibits for five localities in the borough:
Havering-atte-Bower
Hornchurch
Romford
Rainham
Upminster

Staffing 
The museum is made up of core team of  30 enthusiastic and committed volunteers who work across a variety of areas including, Collections, Education, Front of House and Administration and interns who help with the day-to-day running of the building and assist with special projects.

Facilities 
The museum has two rooms at either end of the building the Learning Zone and The Exhibition Room available for various schools and organisations in the community throughout  the course of the year. Both come with their own kitchen. It also has disabled access along with a wheelchair lift and three disabled toilets. The rear doors make it accessible to the Emergency Services. As most Museums do Havering Museum also comes with a shop.

References

External links 
Welcome to the Havering Museum

Havering Museum on Instagram

Museums established in 2010
Museums in the London Borough of Havering
Local museums in London
2010 in London
2010 establishments in England
Romford